Allan Kuhn Grim (October 15, 1904 – December 7, 1965) was a United States district judge of the United States District Court for the Eastern District of Pennsylvania.

Education and career

Born in Kutztown, Pennsylvania, Grim received an Artium Baccalaureus degree from Swarthmore College in 1924 and a Bachelor of Laws from Harvard Law School in 1929. He was in private practice in Reading, Pennsylvania from 1929 to 1949. He was Chairman of the Berks County, Pennsylvania Democratic Party Committee from 1940 to 1944.

Federal judicial service

On October 21, 1949, Grim received a recess appointment from  President Harry S. Truman to a new seat on the United States District Court for the Eastern District of Pennsylvania created by 63 Stat. 493. Formally nominated to the same seat by President Truman on January 5, 1950, Grim was confirmed by the United States Senate on April 4, 1950, and received his commission on April 7, 1950. He assumed senior status due to a certified disability on November 1, 1961, serving in that capacity until his death on December 7, 1965, in Philadelphia, Pennsylvania.

References

Sources
 

1904 births
1965 deaths
Swarthmore College alumni
Harvard Law School alumni
Judges of the United States District Court for the Eastern District of Pennsylvania
United States district court judges appointed by Harry S. Truman
20th-century American judges
20th-century American lawyers